This is a list of the National Register of Historic Places listings in Wharton County, Texas.

This is intended to be a complete list of properties and districts listed on the National Register of Historic Places in Wharton County, Texas. There are three districts and 29 individual properties listed on the National Register in the county. Two individually listed properties are Recorded Texas Historic Landmarks while one district contains several State Antiquities Landmarks including one that is also a Recorded Texas Historic Landmark.

Current listings

The locations of National Register properties and districts may be seen in a mapping service provided.

|}

See also

National Register of Historic Places listings in Texas
Recorded Texas Historic Landmarks in Wharton County

References

External links

Registered Historic Places
Wharton County
Buildings and structures in Wharton County, Texas